In the House is a 2012 French comedy drama directed by François Ozon. The film's screenplay by Ozon is loosely based on Juan Mayorga's play El chico de la última fila (The Boy in the Last Row).

The film won the main prize at the 2012 San Sebastián International Film Festival, the Golden Shell, as well as the Jury Prize for Best Screenplay.

Plot
Germain, a middle-aged literature teacher, bonds with his 16-year-old student, Claude Garcia, while tutoring him to improve his writing skills. This leads the precocious and disdainful student to be increasingly transgressive and antisocial, demonstrating a flair for manipulating relationship dynamics and for finding ways to satisfy his needs. The student seduces his friend's mother and the teacher's wife. He inadvertently causes the teacher to be dismissed but they remain in touch due to their mutual passion in finding stories that excite them.

Cast
 Fabrice Luchini as Germain Germain
 Kristin Scott Thomas as Jeanne Germain
 Emmanuelle Seigner as Esther Artole 
 Denis Ménochet as Raphael 'Rapha' Artole (Senior).
 Bastien Ughetto as Raphael 'Rapha' Artole (Junior).
 Ernst Umhauer as Claude Garcia
 Yolande Moreau as Rosalie / Eugénie

Production
François Ozon adapted the screenplay from Spanish writer Juan Mayorga's play The Boy in the Last Row. The film was produced through Mandarin Cinéma for a budget of 9.2 million euro. It received support from France 2 Cinéma and Mars Films. Filming took place during eight weeks in August and September 2011.

Release
The film opened in France on 3 October 2012 through Mars Distribution.

Box office
In the House earned $9,529,425 in France and $17,860,068 altogether overseas while grossing $389,757 in the United States for a worldwide total of $18,249,825.

Critical reception
The film has received critical acclaim. Review aggregator Rotten Tomatoes reports that 89% of 81 critics gave the film a positive review, for an average rating of 7.4/10. Metacritic gave the film a score of 72 out of 100, based on 25 critics.

References

External links

 
 
 
 
 

2012 comedy-drama films
2012 films
2010s French-language films
Films about educators
French films based on plays
Films directed by François Ozon
French comedy-drama films
2010s French films